Hormathiidae is a family of sea anemones in the class Anthozoa.

Genera
Genera in this family include:

 Actinauge Verrill, 1883
 Adamsia Forbes, 1840
 Allantactis Danielssen, 1890
 Calliactis Verrill, 1869
 Cataphellia Stephenson, 1929
 Chitonanthus
 Chondranthus Migot & Portmann, 1926
 Chondrophellia Carlgren, 1925
 Gliactis
 Handactis Fautin, 2016
 Hormathia Gosse, 1859
 Hormathianthus Carlgren, 1943
 Leptoteichus Stephenson, 1918
 Monactis Riemann-Zurneck, 1986
 Paracalliactis Carlgren, 1928
 Paraphellia Haddon, 1889
 Paraphelliactis Carlgren, 1928
 Parastephanauge Dufaure, 1959
 Phelliactis Simon, 1892

References

 
Cnidarian families
Taxa named by Oskar Carlgren